Textile recycling is the process of recovering fiber, yarn, or fabric and reprocessing the material into new, useful products. Textile waste is split into pre-consumer and post-consumer waste and is sorted into five different categories derived from a pyramid model. Textiles can be either reused or mechanically/chemically recycled.

There has been a shift in recent years toward recycling textiles because of new regulations in several countries. In response, companies are developing products from both post-consumer waste and recycled materials such as plastics. Results from academic studies demonstrate that textile reuse and recycling are more advantageous than incineration and landfilling.

Waste 
Over 100 billion garments are produced annually, most of which end up in incinerators or landfills. The EPA reported that in 2018 alone, 17 million tons of textile municipal solid waste (MSW) was generated. The fashion industry is arguably one of the second biggest polluters next to the oil industry. By textile recycling, it decreases landfill space, creates less pollution, and reduces the consumption of power and water. Most materials used in textile recycling can be split into two categories: pre-consumer and post-consumer waste.

Pre-consumer 
Pre-consumer waste involves secondary materials from textile, fiber, and cotton industries. These products are repurposed for other industries i.e. furniture, mattress, coarse yarn, home building, automotive, paper, and apparel.

Pre-consumer can also refer to overstock or left-over garments that retailers have not been able to sell to consumers.

Post-consumer 
Post-consumer waste consists of textile garments and household articles that have been discarded by their owners. These textile articles are typically discarded because they are damaged, worn out, or outdated. 85% of post-consumer waste in the United States, however, is found in landfills. The remaining post-consumer waste can be directed towards second-hand retailers to be resold or passed on to warehouses dedicated to textile recycling.

Categories 
Textiles are sorted into categories according to the pyramid model, which organizes textiles by their quality and usability. These category placements determine which processes are used to recycle or reuse the textile. Such categories are: textiles for used clothing markets, textiles for conversion, wiping and polishing clothes, textiles sent to landfills and incinerators, and diamonds.

Diamonds 
Diamonds are older, trendier clothing items that are from high-end, well-known brands. Diamonds make up 1-2% of recycled textiles. Despite being the smallest category, diamonds generate the largest amount of profit per item for recycling companies. Clothing and accessories that are considered diamonds include couture, Harley Davidson, Levi's, Ralph Lauren, and luxury fibers (for example cashmere). These second-hand clothing articles are in high demand and can be sold online, in retail boutiques, or in vintage shops.

Landfill and incineration 
Around 7% of recycled textile products are either incinerated or placed in a landfill. Textiles that are placed in landfills have no value and are unable to be repurposed; this process is costly and is avoided when possible. Textiles can also be incinerated to produce electrical energy. This practice is more common in Europe than in the United States because European boiler systems have higher capabilities than American boiler systems. Although incinerating municipal solid waste (MSW) is not yet feasible in the United States, over two thirds of MSW is incinerated in countries such as Denmark, Japan, and Switzerland. The energy values of burning MSW have been comparable with oil in terms of calories; however, there are obstacles to this process. These obstacles include increasing incineration efficiency and reducing harmful byproducts of incineration.

Wiping and polishing cloths 
Around 17% of used textiles are sorted into the wiping and polishing cloth category. These textiles are deemed un-wearable and are then used to create wiping and polishing cloths. Wiping and polishing cloths can be made from a combination of oleophilic and hydrophilic fibers which are often useful in industrial application. Textiles, such as T-shirts, are commonly used to create these cloths due to its naturally absorbent cotton fibers.

Conversion to new products 
29% of textile waste is reengineered into new products if deemed unusable. Usability depends on whether or not the textiles are stained or torn beyond repair. Shoddy and mungo are the two main results of the reengineering process.

Shoddy involves creating new yarn products from the old materials, and is one of the most historical examples of textile recycling. One of the largest producers of shoddy yarn is Panipat in North India, which has over 300 mills. The majority of shoddy in Panipat is used to create knit blankets, making up over 90% of the blankets that are given to communities in disaster relief.

Mungo was invented after shoddy and refers to the process of using textile clippings to make wool. This wool is exported to European countries, whose cooler climates and flammability regulations result in a greater need for mungo.

Shoddy and mungo can be utilized for both high and low quality products. These reengineered fibers have been used in cashmere sweaters and in stuffing for furniture, automobiles, and punching bags.

Used clothing markets 
48% of textiles are sorted into the used clothing markets category. Western countries export used textiles to developing countries or to disaster relief. In developing nations, used Western textiles are highly valued as they are often more affordable than local textiles. Used Western textiles are also sold to the lower and middle classes in more developed countries whose incomes are not large enough to purchase more-expensive, local textiles. Because textile exportation is a global industry, exporters must be conscious of the varying trade regulations and restrictions in different countries.

Processing

Reuse 
Textile reuse is the preferable processing method because it extends the original product's lifetime. Reuse occurs when textile owners rent, trade, swap, borrow, inherit products through second-hand stores, garage sales, online/flea markets, or charities.

Recycling

Mechanical 
Mechanical processing is a recycling method in which textile fabric is broken down while the fibers are still preserved. Once shredded down, these fibers can be spun to create new fabrics. This is the most commonly used technique to recycle textiles and is a process that is particularly well developed for cotton textiles. Mechanical processing protocols can differ depending on the material, so it also requires several levels of sorting before the process begins. 

Textiles must be separated by fabric composition and by color to avoid re-dying and bleaching of materials. Once sorted, the textile materials can then be shredded, washed, and separated into smaller fibers. These individual fibers are then aligned together in a process known as carding in preparation to be spun together. Some fibers, including cotton, must be spun along with a carrier fiber to maintain higher quality. These carrier fibers are most commonly cotton, organic cotton, or polyester. Once the fibers are spun into new yarn, they can be used to create new textiles. This process functions as a semi-closed loop of recycling. The number of times a material can be recycled is dependent on the quality of the fibers, which decreases with each cycle of mechanical processing. 

Mechanical processing can also be used with materials other than textiles. One common example of this is polyester. In the case of polyester, the recycled materials are plastic bottles made of polyethylene terephthalate (PET). In a similar manner to textiles, plastics are sorted by color and type when they arrive at recycling facilities. The plastic is then shredded and washed to break it down and remove contaminants. The dried plastic remnants are molded into PET pellets and then undergo extrusion to create new fibers. These new fibers can then be used to create new textiles.

Chemical 
Chemical processing occurs when textile reuse is infeasible. This process is not yet widely implemented, but there are companies that are researching and integrating chemical recycling. The major small scale production sites are from Eco Circle, Worn Again, Evrnu, and Ioncell. 

Chemical recycling is used on synthetic fibers, such as Polyethylene terephthalate (PET). These synthetic fibers can be broken down to create fibers, yarn, and textiles. For PET, the starting materials are first broken down to the molecular level by using chemicals that facilitate glycolysis, methanolysis, hydrolysis, and/or ammonolysis. This act of depolymerization also removes contaminants from the starting material such as dyes and unwanted fibers. From here, the material is polymerized and used to produce textile products.

Unlike the mechanical method of recycling, chemical recycling produces high-quality fibers similar to the original fiber used. Therefore, no new fibers are needed to support the product of the chemical process. Different chemicals and processes are used for other materials such as nylon and cellulose-based fibers, but the overall structure of the process is the same.

Textiles made from recycled materials 
Many companies such as Patagonia, Everlane, Heavy Eco, and Girlfriend Collective now develop their products from a combination of recycled post-consumer textile waste as well as other recycled materials such as plastics. This can be done for textiles other than clothing as well. For example, Egetæpper is a Danish carpet manufacturing company that makes their carpets using the fibers from recycled fishnets.

Many of these companies also develop programs specifically designed to reduce manufacturing waste and allow their customers to recycle old articles of clothing through the same company. Glen Raven, Inc., a fabric manufacturer, engineered such a program which collects unused pieces during production and recycles them into a new fabric.

One specific region that is more progressive in applications of recycled textiles is Scandinavia, which has created mainstream market products. In Sweden, companies such as Lindex and H&M are including pre-consumer and post-consumer waste fibers within their new clothing lines. Similarly in Finland, Pure Waste is a clothing enterprise that creates t-shirts from recycled fibers in their 95% wind powered factories.

Growth

A shift toward recycled textiles 
New regulations for the textile industry have been introduced in several countries that favor the use of recycled materials. On March 30th, 2022, the European Commission published the EU Strategy for Sustainable and Circular Textiles which outlines the EU’s action plan to achieve better sustainability and regulation within the textile industry. The European Commission’s goal for 2030 is to encourage consumers to invest in high quality products rather than “fast-fashion”, and to ensure all textile products are durable, whether they are recycled materials or not. The EU's strategy includes regulating overproduction, reducing the release of microplastics during production, and utilizing EU Extended Producer Responsibility to ensure producers are acting sustainably.

In response to shifting consumer expectations, investments in textile recycling companies have increased to achieve better sustainability in the textile industry. Inditex and Bill Gates’ Breakthrough Energy Ventures invested in the start-up recycling company Circ in July 2022, which has patented new technologies to reengineer used fibers. In July 2021, H&M and Adidas invested in the chemical recycling company Infinited Fiber Company (IFC) which produces a reengineered fiber that is similar to cotton and is biodegradable. Goldman Sachs led an investment in mechanically recycled cotton company Recover Textile Systems in June 2022.

Many luxury fashion brands are publicly displaying their investment in sustainability approaches, with a common goal to shift towards circular systems and utilizing re-engineered and/or biodegradable materials in their collections.

Environmental impact 
Textile reuse and textile recycling processes are the most environmentally friendly methods of processing textiles, while incineration and landfilling are considered to be the least environmentally friendly. When comparing textile reuse to textile recycling, textile reuse is more advantageous. A Swedish study found that for each tonne of textile waste, textile reuse can save 8 tonnes of CO2 in terms of global warming potential (GWP) and 164 GJ of energy usage. In comparison, textile recycling saves 5.6 tonnes of CO2 in terms of GWP and 116 GJ of energy usage.

There are a few circumstances under which recycling and reuse might be less effective. For instance, regarding recycling, the benefits might be offset if the replacement rates are relatively low, if recycling is energized by fossil fuels, or if the avoided manufacture procedures are clean. Also, with respect to reuse, the environmental impact of transport may surpass the upsides of the avoided manufacturing, unless the use life of the reused item is considerably prolonged. These circumstances should be taken into account when advocating, designing and implementing new textile recycling and reuse procedures.

See also 
Global trade of secondhand clothing
Sustainable fashion

References

Clothing and the environment
Recycling by product
Textiles
Water conservation